József Reményi (23 January 1887 Kosice – 25 December 1977 Budapest) was a Hungarian sculptor, medallist, and coin designer who, following his studies in Italy and (Germany), worked as teacher of applied arts and was later nominated the artistic director of the Hungarian Mint. Considered one of the creators of Hungarian numismatic art, he designed more than 900 plaques and coins, including several items of Hungarian forint currency.

References 

 Pogány Ö. G.: Reményi József életművéről, Művészet, 1961/1963.
 Csengeryné Nagy ZS.: Reményi József, Művészet, 1968/1963.
 Pogány Ö. G.: Reményi József kiállítása a Magyar Nemzeti Galériában, Művészet, 1972/1974.
 L. Kovásznai Viktória: Reményi József művészi pályája, M. Ért., 1977
 L. Kovásznai Viktória: Reményi József éremművészete, Magyar Numizmatikai Társulat Évkönyve, 1978
 L. Kovásznai Viktória: Reményi József éremművészete 1903–1977, Budapest, 1980.
 Kovács P.: A tegnap szobrai. Fejezetek a magyar szobrászat félmúltjából, Szombathely, 1992
 L. Kovásznai Viktória: Fejezetek a magyar éremművészet történetéből, Budapest, 1999.
 Reményi József, Kortárs magyar művészeti lexikon [III. (P–Z).'' Főszerk. Fitz Péter. Budapest: Enciklopédia. 2001. 
 Magyar életrajzi lexikon 1000–1990 – Reményi József

1887 births
1977 deaths
Artists from Košice
Hungarian designers
20th-century Hungarian sculptors